Bălănești is a commune in Gorj County, Oltenia, Romania. It is composed of seven villages: Bălănești, Blidari, Cânepești, Glodeni, Ohaba, Voiteștii din Deal and Voiteștii din Vale.

References

Communes in Gorj County
Localities in Oltenia